Zao Dam is a rockfill dam located in Shiga prefecture in Japan. The dam is used for irrigation. The catchment area of the dam is 9.4 km2. The dam impounds about 33  ha of land when full and can store 4790 thousand cubic meters of water. The construction of the dam was started on 1972 and completed in 1990.

References

Dams in Shiga Prefecture
1990 establishments in Japan